The Oxford Companion to American Literature by James D. Hart is one of the Oxford Companions series published by the Oxford University Press, Oxford and New York. The Concise Oxford Companion to American Literature, by James D. Hart (an abridged version of the 5th ed., 1983) was published in 1986.

Editions
 First, 1941
 Second, 1948
 Third, 1956
 Fourth, 1965
 Fifth, 1983  with revisions and additions by Phillip W. Leininger  
 Sixth, 12 October 1995, with revisions and additions by Phillip W. Leininger

References

American non-fiction books
Oxford University Press reference books